Wine and Spirits may refer to:

 Wine & Spirit, a British wine and alcohol publication aimed at consumers and the drinks industry
 Wine & Spirits, an American wine magazine
 Wine and Spirits Fair Dealing Act, an infamous and short-lived Illinois law

See also
Wines & Spirits, 2007 album by Rahsaan Patterson